Ingatestone and Fryerning is a civil parish in the Brentwood borough of Essex, England.

History
The civil parish was formed on 24 March 1889 by merging the ancient parishes of Ingatestone and Fryerning. The two parishes were oddly shaped, with the parish of Fryerning running from the north-west to the south-east of Ingatestone, bisecting the other parish.

Unusually, most of the village of Ingatestone was in the parish of Fryerning, and therefore not in the parish of Ingatestone.

On 1 October 1950 some land around Handley Green was moved to the parish of Margaretting, and at the same time an area to the south-west of Margaretting Hall was added to Ingatestone and Fryerning.

Parish council
A year after the passing of the Local Government Act 1894, Ingatestone and Fryerning Parish Council was formed. Since then, the council has had thirteen different chairmen.

The parish council today has fifteen directly-elected members who each serve for four years. There are no wards – all councillors are elected by the entire parish – and all fifteen are elected at the same time. The most recent elections were held in May 2011 and were contested by twenty candidates.

The entire parish council meets monthly, although there are also meetings of three committees: Policy and Resources, Churchyards and Environment, and Planning. The Planning Committee meets once a fortnight, the other two committees once a month.

The parish council raises a precept on the local Council Tax, and has an annual income of around £120,000. The council has offices and directly employs three members of staff.

Activities
The parish council is responsible for a range of local amenities with the villages:
 Fryerning cemetery
 Closed churchyard in Ingatestone
 Fairfield recreation ground, including provision of play equipment
 Sports pavilion at Seymour Field recreation ground
 Management of sports facilities at Seymour Field, and provision of BMX track
 Provision of bus shelters
 Organisation of village events, including Victorian-themed Christmas evening
 Examining and responding to all planning applications within the parish
 Provision of village signs
 Operation of allotments
 Proposing parking restrictions within parish

References

External links 
 Ingatestone & Fryerning Parish Council website

Civil parishes in Essex
Borough of Brentwood